Horakiella is a genus of fungi within the Sclerodermataceae family that contains the two species  H.clelandii and H. watarrkana.

The genus name of Horakiella is in honour of Egon Horak (born 1937) is an Austrian mycologist.

The genus was circumscribed by Michael A. Castellano and James Martin Trappe in Austral. Syst. Bot. vol.5 on page 641 in 1992.

References

External links
 Index Fungorum

Boletales
Monotypic Boletales genera
Taxa named by James Trappe